Massachusetts House of Representatives' 1st Middlesex district in the United States is one of 160 legislative districts included in the lower house of the Massachusetts General Court. It covers part of Middlesex County. Democrat Margaret Scarsdale of Pepperell has represented the district since 2023. Candidates for this district seat in the 2022 Massachusetts general election included Andrew Shepherd and Catherine Lundeen.

Towns Represented
The district includes the following localities:
 Ashby
 Dunstable
 Groton (Precincts 2 and 3)
  Lunenburg (Precincts A, B1, C, & D) 
 Pepperell
 Townsend

The current district geographic boundary overlaps with those of the Massachusetts Senate's 1st Middlesex district and the Worcester and Middlesex district.

Former locale
The district previously covered part of Charlestown, circa 1872.

Representatives
 Edward Lawrence, circa 1858-1859 
 Joseph Caldwell, circa 1859 
 John Read, circa 1888 
 Chester F. Sanger, circa 1888 
 Edward Sennott, circa 1908
 William Hogan, circa 1908
 Willis McMenimen, circa 1918
 James H. Kelleher, circa 1920 
 Francis David Coady, circa 1935
 Thomas Dillon, circa 1935
 Thomas Francis Coady, circa 1945
 Thomas Francis Coady, Jr., circa 1951-1953 
 John Joseph Toomey, circa 1951 
 Michael Lombardi, circa 1967
 Michael James Lombardi, circa 1975 
 Bruce Wetherbee, circa 1983
 Augusta Hornblower, 1984-1994
 Robert Hargraves, circa 1995
 Sheila C. Harrington, 2011-2022
 Margaret R. Scarsdale, 2023-Present

See also
 List of Massachusetts House of Representatives elections
 Other Middlesex County districts of the Massachusetts House of Representatives: 2nd, 3rd, 4th, 5th, 6th, 7th, 8th, 9th, 10th, 11th, 12th, 13th, 14th, 15th, 16th, 17th, 18th, 19th, 20th, 21st, 22nd, 23rd, 24th, 25th, 26th, 27th, 28th, 29th, 30th, 31st, 32nd, 33rd, 34th, 35th, 36th, 37th
 List of Massachusetts General Courts
 List of former districts of the Massachusetts House of Representatives

Images
Portraits of legislators

References

Further reading

External links

 Ballotpedia
  (State House district information based on U.S. Census Bureau's American Community Survey).

House
Government of Middlesex County, Massachusetts